A Love So Beautiful is a 2017 Chinese streaming television series.

A Love So Beautiful may also refer to:

 A Love So Beautiful (2020 TV series), a South Korean short form drama based on the 2017 Chinese drama of the same name
 A Love So Beautiful (album), a 2017 compilation album by Roy Orbison
 "A Love So Beautiful", a song by Roy Orbison from the 1988 album Mystery Girl